Kalaroa is an upazila of Satkhira District in the Division of Khulna, Bangladesh, Kolaroa Upazila was established in 1983, 18 km Distance From District Headquarters, Kolaroa Bazar is one of the Prosperous and Successful Business Places in Satkhira District,

Geography 
It has 35,475 households and a total area of 232.64 km2.

Kalaroa borders Sharsha, Jhikargachha and Manirampur upazilas to the north, Satkhira Sadar and Tala upazilas to the south, Keshabpur, Manirampur and Tala upazilas and the Kobadak river to the east and Swarupnagar CD Block in North 24 Parganas district in the Indian state of West Bengal to the west.

The main rivers are the Kopothakho, Betraboti, Sonai, and Ichamati. Lohakura, Kumarnal, Murari Katy, Gonopatipur, Sonabaria, Kushudanga, Tulshidanga, Batra, Sreerampur, Bujtola, Kazirhat, Khorda, Saraskati and Chandanpur are the most famous villages in Kalaroa.

Demographics 
According to the 2011 Bangladesh census, Kalaroa had a population of 237,992. Males constituted 49.08% of the population and females 50.92%. Muslims formed 93.89% of the population, Hindus 5.19%, Christians 0.76% and others 0.15%. Kalaroa had a literacy rate of 50.94% for the population 7 years and above.

According to the 1991 Bangladesh census, Kalaroa had a population of 190,721. Males constituted 50.96% of the population, and females 49.04%. The population aged 18 or over was 97,044. Kalaroa had an average literacy rate of 25.6% (7+ years), compared to the national average of 32.4%.

Arts and culture
Cultural organisations include 41 clubs, five public libraries, a public institute, three cinema halls, 12 women's organisations, 27 playgrounds and a kishore theatre.

The locally published newspapers and periodicals are Pathikrit, Samatat, Suryashikha, Subarna Prasun and Dalchhut.

Religious institutions include 405 mosques, eight temples and three churches.

Administration 
Kalaroa Upazila is divided into Kalaroa Municipality and 12 union parishads: Chandanpur, Diara, Helatala, Jallabad, Jogikhali, Joynagar, Kaila, Keragachhi, Keralkata, Kushadanga, Langaljhara, and Sonabaria. The union parishads are subdivided into 112 mauzas and 136 villages.

Kalaroa Municipality is subdivided into 9 wards and 9 mahallas.

Education 
The oldest educational institution of Kalaroa is Dhandia Union Institution which was established in 1915.
Hathatgonj Secondary High School (1965)
Boalia Muktijuddha college
The average literacy rate is 25.4%, 33.2% among males and 17.6% among females.

There are five degree colleges in the upazila. Honors level ones include Hazi Nasir Uddin College, Kalaroa Government College, and Sheikh Amanullah Degree College. Pass level ones include Bongobondhu Mohila College and Sonar Bangla Degree College. Other educational institutions include 4 technical institutions, 31 high schools, 6 junior high schools, 64 madarasa (notably Brozobaksha Islampur Madrasha and Kalaroa Alia Madrasha), 67 government primary schools, 45 non-government primary schools, 12 low cost primary schools and 5 satellite schools. Noted educational institutions include Sonabaria Sammilita Secondary School (1967) Murarikati Taraknandi Primary School (1881), Kaila High School (1983), Dhandia High School (1885), Kalaroa GKMK Pilot High School (1930), Girls' Pilot High School (1968) and Khorda M.L High School (1959).

There is a Shohid Minar near the upazila post office.

Notable residents
Habibul Islam Habib Ex- Member of Parliament-105, Satkhira-1, Bangladesh National Parliament, Publicity and Publication Affairs Secretary Bangladesh Nationalist Party. Sheikh Amanullah, He was the president of the Jessore Education Board, a self-established Sheikh Amanullah Degree College in Kolaroa upazila,

References 

Upazilas of Satkhira District
Satkhira District
Khulna Division